Sarah Jane Powell Log Cabin, is a historic home located at Cooksville, Howard County, Maryland, United States.

In 1850, Thomas Hood was one of three founding county commissioners of Howard County. In 1859 Thomas Hood built the log cabin on his property for his slave Sarah Jane Powell (born 1827) for her "unwavering fidelity and general moral worth as a servant". The cabin is a 3-bay-wide, -story-tall structure with a brick fireplace. Sarah Jane Powell married Alfred Dorsey, and had their first child in the cabin in 1865. In May 1869, the -acre property the cabin resided on named "Poverty Discovered" was deeded to Sarah Jane Dorsey. The cabin has been occupied by over seven generations of Dorseys, with a family graveyard located on the property. The property is just north of a former crossroads town named Inwood, and adjacent to a 30-acre parcel owned by the Board of Education in the 1970s, which has not been developed.

See also
List of Howard County properties in the Maryland Historical Trust
Mount Gregory Methodist Church - Also built on Thomas Hood plantation land

References

External links
African American Historical Houses of Howard County

African-American history of Howard County, Maryland
Houses completed in 1859
Houses in Howard County, Maryland
Howard County, Maryland landmarks
Buildings and structures in Ellicott City, Maryland
Slave cabins and quarters in the United States